AHT Cooling Systems is an Austrian company, active in both branches of industrial refrigeration and deep freezing, while its main areas of business are fridges and deep freezers for supermarkets, ice cream freezers and bottle coolers. Daikin acquired AHT in 2019.

The area of refrigeration and deep freezers for supermarkets basically involves plug-in refrigeration and freezer systems and constitutes approximately 60% of the total turnover, which was more than €200 million in 2007. 

The company is based in the region of Styria in the middle of Austria and has about 800 employees. Besides its main plant in the city of Rottenmann, AHT runs subsidiaries in the UK, the United States of America, Germany, Turkey, Thailand, Brazil, China.

References 

Manufacturing companies of Austria
Austrian brands
Economy of Styria